Joseph Daniel Mario Tremblay (born September 2, 1956) is a former professional ice hockey player and former coach in the National Hockey League (NHL). As a player, he was a five-time Stanley Cup winner with the Montreal Canadiens.

He was honoured by his hometown of Alma, which named its local arena "Le Centre Mario-Tremblay". Since 1981, Tremblay has owned the sports bar in his hometown called "Bar-Restaurant chez Mario Tremblay".

Playing career
Tremblay, nicknamed "Le bleuet bionique" (The Bionic Blueberry), played his junior hockey with the Montreal Bleu Blanc Rouge and played with the Montreal Canadiens for his entire NHL playing career (1974–1986), winning five Stanley Cup championships with the team as a player in 1976, 1977, 1978, 1979, and 1986. In 852 regular season games in the NHL, he scored 258 goals and added 326 assists for 584 points, with 1043 penalty minutes. He scored the winning goal in game six of the 1978 Stanley Cup finals, giving the cup to the Canadiens. He was the winner of the Molson Cup for the 1982-83 season. Tremblay is 10th on the Montreal Canadiens all-time list for plus-minus at 184. Tremblay remains the youngest goal scorer in franchise history, having achieved his inaugural tally at age 18 years, 75 days on November 16, 1974 against the New York Rangers at the Forum. 

In his first few season with the Canadiens, he was part of a very dynamic forward line alongside center Doug Risebrough (who was also a rookie in 1974-75) and LW Yvon Lambert. Their job was to contain their opponents' main scoring line and to create room for the team's highly-skilled players by agitating and pestering their opponents' best players. When the three began playing together a few weeks into the 1974-75 season, they lit a fire under a team that had started the year slowly, winning just 3 of its first 10 games. All three were regular visitors to the penalty box during those years. The line was together for all four Stanley Cup wins from 1976 to 1979. In later years, Tremblay was given more goal-scoring responsibilities and was a regular on the power play. He scored 30 or more goals in four different seasons, the first time in 1978-79, his fifth season in the league.

He announced his retirement in September 1986, after suffering a serious shoulder injury the previous season.

Coaching career

Montreal Canadiens
Tremblay was hired four games into the 1995–96 season as head coach of the Canadiens although he had no previous coaching experience. Tremblay had a long running dispute with star goaltender Patrick Roy, which started from their days as teammates, and not long after Tremblay became coach this eventually led to Roy's departure from Montreal. The two had almost come to blows in a Long Island coffee shop before Tremblay was announced as coach, and Roy snickered when Tremblay arrived in the dressing room for the first time. They almost fought a second time after Tremblay fired a shot at Roy's throat during practice.

Tremblay kept Roy in net during a December 2, 1995, game versus the Detroit Red Wings, in which the Wings scored nine goals on Roy, who was jeered by the Montreal fans.  Roy stormed off the ice and told team president Ronald Corey that he would never play for the Canadiens again. Four days later, Roy was traded to Colorado with captain Mike Keane for Jocelyn Thibault, Martin Rucinsky and Andrei Kovalenko. Roy went on to lead the Avalanche to two Stanley Cups before retiring.  The rivalry would continue into the coaching ranks, as Roy would later (on October 15, 2013) tie Tremblay's record for longest winning streak (six games) to begin an NHL coaching career.

Nearly a year after Roy left the Canadiens, Tremblay also had a heated verbal exchange with Habs enforcer Donald Brashear during a team practice prior to a game against the Avalanche in Denver. Brashear was later traded to the Vancouver Canucks.

As a head coach for Montreal, Tremblay coached 159 games, with 71 wins, 63 losses and 25 ties across two years with the team.

Minnesota Wild and New Jersey Devils
In 2001, Tremblay became an assistant coach for the Minnesota Wild under head coach Jacques Lemaire. He remained there for seven seasons, through 2008–09. In 2009, he followed Lemaire to the New Jersey Devils where he remained an assistant coach under Lemaire. Lemaire retired in 2010 after one season in New Jersey and Tremblay was not retained as assistant coach. He then joined the Quebec sport network RDS as a hockey analyst for the Montreal Canadiens games.

Personal life 
Mario is the uncle of the professional hockey player, Pascal Trépanier.

Career statistics

Coaching record

References

Molson Cup winner : http://ourhistory.canadiens.com/player/Mario-Tremblay

External links 
http://www.hockeydraftcentral.com/1974/74012.html

1956 births
Living people
Canadian ice hockey coaches
French Quebecers
Ice hockey people from Quebec
Minnesota Wild coaches
Montreal Canadiens coaches
Montreal Canadiens draft picks
Montreal Canadiens players
Montreal Bleu Blanc Rouge players
National Hockey League broadcasters
National Hockey League first-round draft picks
New Jersey Devils coaches
People from Alma, Quebec
Stanley Cup champions
Canadian ice hockey right wingers